Karen Fonteyne (born January 29, 1969) is a Canadian competitor in synchronized swimming and Olympic medalist.

She participated on the Canadian team that received a silver medal in synchronized team at the 1996 Summer Olympics in Atlanta.

She received a silver medal in duet with Karn Sribney at the 1987 Pan American Games in Indianapolis.

References

External links

1969 births
Living people
Canadian synchronized swimmers
Olympic silver medalists for Canada
Olympic synchronized swimmers of Canada
Synchronized swimmers at the 1996 Summer Olympics
Olympic medalists in synchronized swimming
World Aquatics Championships medalists in synchronised swimming
Synchronized swimmers at the 1991 World Aquatics Championships
Medalists at the 1996 Summer Olympics
Pan American Games medalists in synchronized swimming
Pan American Games silver medalists for Canada
Synchronized swimmers at the 1987 Pan American Games
Synchronized swimmers at the 1995 Pan American Games
Medalists at the 1987 Pan American Games
20th-century Canadian women
21st-century Canadian women